The Putumayo genocide is the term which is used in reference to the enslavement, massacres and ethnocide of the indigenous population of the Amazon at the hands of the Peruvian Amazon Company, specifically in the area between the Putumayo River and the Caquetá River during the Amazon rubber boom period from 1879 to 1912.

Events
The Peruvian government ceded to the Peruvian Amazon Company the Amazon territories north of Loreto, after the company's founder Julio César Arana purchased the land. Shortly after, private hosts of Arana – brought from Barbados – which consisted of forcing Amerindians to work for him in exchange for "favors and protection", with the offer being unable to deny as disagreements led to their kidnapping by mercenaries paid by the company. The Amerindians were subjected to isolation processes in remote areas to collect rubber in inhuman conditions and if they did not meet the required amount, they were punished with death or were disappeared in "distant camps" where ninety percent of the affected Amazonian populations were annihilated.

In popular culture
The Dream of the Celt by Mario Vargas Llosa details some of Irishman Roger Casement's experiences in investigating the genocide
The Vortex by José Eustasio Rivera is based on the events
Embrace of the Serpent directed by Ciro Guerra includes characters affected by the genocide

References

Genocides in South America
Slavery in Colombia
Slavery in Peru